Ashtanga vinyasa yoga is a style of yoga as exercise popularised by K. Pattabhi Jois during the twentieth century, often promoted as a modern-day form of classical Indian yoga. Jois claimed to have learnt the system from his teacher Tirumalai Krishnamacharya. The style is energetic, synchronising breath with movements. The individual poses (asanas) are linked by flowing movements (vinyasas).

Jois established his Ashtanga Yoga Research Institute in 1948. The current style of teaching is called "Mysore style", after the city in India where the practice was originally taught. Ashtanga vinyasa yoga has given rise to various spinoff styles of power yoga.

Approach

Traditionally, ashtanga vinyasa yoga students memorised a sequence and practised it together without being led by a teacher. Teacher-led classes were introduced in K. Pattabhi Jois's later years. Such classes are typically taught twice per week in place of Mysore style classes. Teachers guide the practice, adjusting and assisting with postures and leading the group of students through a series of postures all at the same time.

Sequences and series 

An ashtanga vinyasa practice of asanas typically begins with five repetitions of surya namaskara A and B respectively, followed by a standing sequence.
The practitioner then progresses through one of six series of postures, followed by a standard closing sequence.

The six series are:
 The primary series: Yoga chikitsa, yoga for health or yoga therapy
 The intermediate series: Nadishodhana, the nerve purifier (also called the "second series") 
 The Advanced series: Sthira bhaga, centering of strength
 Advanced A, or third series   
 Advanced B, or fourth series   
 Advanced C, or fifth series  
 Advanced D, or sixth series

There were originally four series on the ashtanga vinyasa syllabus: primary, intermediate, advanced A, and advanced B. A fifth series was the "Rishi series", which Pattabhi Jois said could be performed once a practitioner had mastered the preceding four series.

Method of instruction 

According to Pattabhi Jois's grandson R. Sharath Jois, practitioners should master each pose separately attempting the others that follow. However, Pattabhi Jois's son Manju Jois disagreed; in his view, students were occasionally allowed to practice the postures in a non-linear format.

Since the beginning of the twenty-first century a new generation of ashtanga vinyasa yoga teachers have embraced Sharath's rules, teaching in a linear style without variations. Practice typically takes place in a strict, Mysore style environment under the guidance of a Sharath-approved teacher. Workshops, detailed alignment instructions and strength-building exercises should not form part of the method, neither for the practitioner nor for the teacher.  However, most teachers who claim to have been taught by Sharath do in practice employ the above methods, exercises and postures in their teaching.TH

Principles 
Ashtanga vinyasa yoga emphasizes certain key components, namely tristhana ("three places of action or attention", or the more physical aspects of poses) and vinyasa (which Sharath Jois defines as a system of breathing and movement).

Tristhana 

Tristhana means the three places of attention or action: breathing system (pranayama), posture (asana), and looking place (drishti). These are considered core concepts for ashtanga yoga practice, encompassing the three levels of purification: the body, nervous system, and the mind. They are supposed to be performed in conjunction with each other.

Each asana in ashtanga yoga is part of a set sequence, as described above. The stated purpose of the asanas is to increase the strength and flexibility of the body. Officially, the style is accompanied by very little alignment instruction. Breathing is ideally even and steady, in terms of the length of the inhalations and exhalations.

Drishti is the point where one focuses the eyes while practicing asana. In the ashtanga yoga method, there is a prescribed point of focus for every asana. There are nine dristhis: the nose, between the eyebrows, navel, thumb, hands, feet, up, right side and left side.

Vinyasa 

Vinyasas are flowing sequences of movements that connect each asana to the next. Additionally, modern vinyasa yoga coordinates the breath with the vinyasa transition movements between the asanas.

According to Sharath Jois, the purpose of vinyasas is to purify the blood, which is supposedly otherwise heated and contaminated by the practice of asanas.

Breath 

Although ashtanga yoga keeps a general principle of steady and even inhalations and exhalations, the particulars of pranayama during the asana practice are debated.

In his book Yoga Mala, Pattabhi Jois recommends remaining in each posture for five to eight breaths, or else staying in each posture for as long as possible. Breathing instructions given are to do rechaka and puraka (to exhale and inhale) as much as possible. "It is sufficient, however, to breathe in and out five to eight times in each posture." In an interview regarding the length of the breath, Pattabhi Jois instructs practitioners to inhale for ten to fifteen seconds, and to exhale for ten to fifteen seconds. He goes on to clarify: "[if] your breath strength is possibly ten-second inhalations and exhalations, you do ten; fifteen seconds possible, you do fifteen. One hundred possible, you perform one hundred. Five is possible, you do five". His son Manju Jois also recommends taking more breaths in difficult postures.

Various influential figures have discussed the specific process of breathing in ashtanga yoga. Pattabhi Jois recommended breathing fully and deeply with the mouth closed, although he did not specifically term this as ujjayi breathing. However, Manju Jois does, referring to a breathing style called dirgha rechaka puraka, meaning long, deep, slow exhalations and inhalations. "It should be dirgha... long, and like music. The sound is very important. You have to do the ujjayi pranayama". In late 2011, Sharath Jois stated that ujjayi breathing as such was not to be performed in the asana practice, but that asanas should be accompanied merely by deep breathing with sound. He reiterated this notion in a conference in 2013, stating: "You do normal breath, inhalation and exhalation with sound. Ujjayi breath is a type of pranayama. This is just normal breath with free flow".

As far as other types of pranayama are concerned, the consensus is that they should be practised after the asanas have been mastered. Pattabhi Jois originally taught pranayama to those practicing the second series and later changed his mind, teaching pranayama after the third series.
 
Sharath Jois later produced a series of videos teaching alternate nostril breathing to beginners. This pranayama practice was never taught to beginners by his grandfather and it is one of the many changes Sharath has made to the ashtanga yoga method of instruction.

Bandhas 

Bandhas are one of the three key elements of ashtanga vinyasa yoga, alongside breath and drishti. There are three principal bandhas which are considered internal body locks: 

 Mula bandha or root lock at the pelvic floor (drawing in the perineum)
 Uddiyana bandha, drawing back the abdomen approximately two inches below the navel
 Jalandhara bandha, throat lock (achieved by lowering the chin slightly while raising the sternum).

Both Pattabhi Jois and Sharath Jois recommend practising mula and uddiyana bandha even when not practicing asanas. Pattabhi Jois explains: (translated quote) "You completely exhale, apply mula bandha and after inhaling you apply uddiyana bandha. Both bandhas are very important... After bandha practice, take [your attention] to the location where they are applied and maintain that attention at all times, while walking, talking, sleeping and when walk is finished.  Always you control mula bandha".

Sharath Jois says: "Without bandhas, breathing will not be correct, and the asanas will give no benefit".

Opening chant 

Ashtanga practice is traditionally started with the following Sanskrit invocation to Patanjali:

and closes with the "mangala mantra" (Lokaksema):

History

Pattabhi Jois claimed to have learned the system of ashtanga from Tirumalai Krishnamacharya, who in turn claimed to have learned it from a supposed text called Yoga Kurunta by the otherwise unknown author Vamama Rishi. This text was imparted to Krishnamacharya in the early 1900s by his Guru, Yogeshwara Ramamohana Brahmachari. Jois insists that the text described all of the asanas and vinyasas of the sequences of the ashtanga system. However, the text is said to have been eaten by ants so it is impossible to verify his assertions. Additionally, it is unusual that the text is not mentioned as a source in either of the books by Krishnamacharya, Yoga Makaranda (1934) and Yogāsanagalu (c. 1941).

According to Manju Jois, the sequences of ashtanga yoga were created by Krishnamcharya. There is some evidence to support this in Yoga Makaranda, which lists nearly all the postures of the Pattabhi Jois primary series and several postures from the intermediate and advanced series, described with reference to vinyasa.

There is also evidence that the ashtanga yoga series incorporates exercises used by Indian wrestlers and British gymnasts. Recent academic research details documentary evidence that physical journals in the early 20th century were full of the postural shapes that were very similar to Krishnamacharya's asana system. In particular, the flowing surya namaskara, which later became the basis of Krishnamacharya's Mysore style, was in the 1930s considered as exercise and not part of yoga; the two styles were at that time taught separately, in adjacent halls of the Mysore palace.

Etymology 

Jois elided any distinction between his sequences of asanas and the eight-limbed ashtanga yoga (Sanskrit अष्टांग asht-anga, "eight limbs") of Patanjali's Yoga Sutras. The eight limbs of Patanjali's scheme are yama, niyama, asana, pranayama, pratyahara, dharana, dhyana, and samadhi. It was Jois's belief that asana, the third limb, must be practiced first, and only after that could one master the other seven limbs. However, the name ashtanga in Jois's usage may, as yoga scholar Mark Singleton suggests, derive from the old name of surya namaskar in the system of dand gymnastic exercises, which was named ashtang dand after one of the original postures in the sequence, ashtanga namaskara (now replaced by chaturanga dandasana), in which eight body parts all touch the ground, rather than Patanjali's yoga.

Tradition 

There has been much debate over the term "traditional" as applied to ashtanga yoga. The founder's students noted that Jois freely modified the sequence to suit the practitioner. Some of the differences include the addition or subtraction of postures in the sequences, changes to the vinyasa (full and half vinyasa), and specific practice prescriptions to specific people.

Several changes to the practice have been made since its inception. Nancy Gilgoff, an early student, describes many differences in the way she was taught ashtanga to the way it is taught now. According to her experiences, some of the differences include: Pattabhi Jois originally left out seven postures in the standing sequence, but later assigned utthita hasta padangusthasana and ardha baddha padmottanasana before the intermediate series was given; utkatasana, virabhadrasana A and B, parivritta trikonasana, and parivritta parsvakonasana were not in the series at this point; and Jois did not give a vinyasa between the same poses on the different sides of the body or between variations on a pose (e.g., janu sirsasana A, B, and C were done together, followed by a vinyasa. Likewise baddha konasana, upavishta konasana and supta konasana were also grouped together without a vinyasa between them, as were ubhaya padangusthasana and urdhva mukha paschimottanasana.

According to Gilgoff, Pattabhi Jois prescribed practising twice a day, primary and intermediate series, with no vinyasa between sides in krounchasana, bharadvajasana, ardha matsyendrasana, eka pada sirsasana, parighasana, and gomukhasana in the intermediate series. Shalabhasana to parsva dhanurasana were done in a group, with a vinyasa only performed at the end. Ushtrasana through kapotasana also were done altogether. The same went for eka pada sirsasana through yoganidrasana. The closing sequence included only mudrasana, padmasana, and tolasana, until the completion of the intermediate series when the remainder of the closing sequence was assigned. Urdhva dhanurasana and "drop-backs" were taught after the intermediate series. Gilgoff states that the original intermediate series included vrishchikasana after karandavasana and ended with gomukhasana. She also notes that Pattabhi Jois added supta urdhva pada vajrasana as well as the seven headstands when another yogi asked for more; these eight postures were not part of the intermediate series prior to this.

Power yoga spinoffs

Power yoga began in the 1990s via a "nearly simultaneous invention" by two students of K. Pattabhi Jois and similar forms led by other yoga teachers.

Beryl Bender Birch created what Yoga Journal calls "the original power yoga" in 1995.

Bryan Kest, who studied ashtanga yoga under K. Pattabhi Jois, and Baron Baptiste, a Bikram yoga enthusiast, separately put their own spins on the style and provided its branding. Neither Baptiste's power yoga nor Kest's power yoga are synonymous with ashtanga yoga. In 1995, Pattabhi Jois wrote a letter to Yoga Journal expressing his disappointment at the association between his ashtanga yoga and the newly-coined power yoga, referring to it as "ignorant bodybuilding".

Risk of injury 

In an article published by The Economist, it was reported that "a good number of Mr Jois's students seemed constantly to be limping around with injured knees or backs because they had received his "adjustments", yanking them into Lotus, the splits, or a backbend". Tim Miller, one of Jois's students, indicates that "the adjustments were fairly ferocious". Injuries related to Jois's ashtanga yoga have been the subject of discussion in a Huffington Post article.

In 2008, yoga researchers in Europe published a survey of practitioners of ashtanga yoga that indicated that 62 percent of respondents had suffered at least one injury that lasted longer than one month. However, the survey lacked a control group (of similar people not subject to the treatment, such as people who had practised a different form of yoga), which limited its validity.

References

Sources

Further reading

External links
 Ashtanga Yoga - Understanding the Method, Interview with Manju Pattabhi Jois, in English and German (2009)

Yoga styles